The AK-47, officially known as the Avtomat Kalashnikova (also known as the Kalashnikov or just AK), is a gas-operated assault rifle that is chambered for the 7.62×39mm cartridge. Developed in the Soviet Union by Russian small-arms designer Mikhail Kalashnikov, it is the originating firearm of the Kalashnikov (or "AK") family of rifles. After more than seven decades since its creation, the AK-47 model and its variants remain one of the most popular and widely used firearms in the world.

Design work on the AK-47 began in 1945. It was presented for official military trials in 1947, and, in 1948, the fixed-stock version was introduced into active service for selected units of the Soviet Army. In early 1949, the AK was officially accepted by the Soviet Armed Forces and used by the majority of the member states of the Warsaw Pact.

The model and its variants owe their global popularity to their reliability under harsh conditions, low production cost (compared to contemporary weapons), availability in virtually every geographic region, and ease of use. The AK has been manufactured in many countries, and has seen service with armed forces as well as irregular forces and insurgencies throughout the world. , "of the estimated 500 million firearms worldwide, approximately 100 million belong to the Kalashnikov family, three-quarters of which are AK-47s". The model is the basis for the development of many other types of individual, crew-served and specialized firearms.

History

Origins
During World War II, the Sturmgewehr 44 rifle used by German forces made a deep impression on their Soviet counterparts. The select-fire rifle was chambered for a new intermediate cartridge, the 7.92×33mm Kurz, and combined the firepower of a submachine gun with the range and accuracy of a rifle. On 15 July 1943, an earlier model of the Sturmgewehr was demonstrated before the People's Commissariat of Arms of the USSR. The Soviets were impressed with the weapon and immediately set about developing an intermediate caliber fully automatic rifle of their own, to replace the PPSh-41 submachine guns and outdated Mosin–Nagant bolt-action rifles that armed most of the Soviet Army.

The Soviets soon developed the 7.62×39mm M43 cartridge, used in the semi-automatic SKS carbine and the RPD light machine gun. Shortly after World War II, the Soviets developed the AK-47 rifle, which quickly replaced the SKS in Soviet service. Introduced in 1959, the AKM is a lighter stamped steel version and the most ubiquitous variant of the entire AK series of firearms. In the 1960s, the Soviets introduced the RPK light machine gun, an AK type weapon with a stronger receiver, a longer heavy barrel, and a bipod, that eventually replaced the RPD light machine gun.

Concept
Mikhail Kalashnikov began his career as a weapon designer in 1941 while recuperating from a shoulder wound which he received during the Battle of Bryansk. Kalashnikov himself stated..."I was in the hospital, and a soldier in the bed beside me asked: 'Why do our soldiers have only one rifle for two or three of our men, when the Germans have automatics?' So I designed one. I was a soldier, and I created a machine gun for a soldier. It was called an Avtomat Kalashnikova, the automatic weapon of Kalashnikov—AK—and it carried the year of its first manufacture, 1947."

The AK-47 is best described as a hybrid of previous rifle technology innovations. "Kalashnikov decided to design an automatic rifle combining the best features of the American M1 Garand and the German StG 44." Kalashnikov's team had access to these weapons and had no need to "reinvent the wheel". Kalashnikov himself observed: "A lot of Russian Army soldiers ask me how one can become a constructor, and how new weaponry is designed. These are very difficult questions. Each designer seems to have his own paths, his own successes and failures. But one thing is clear: before attempting to create something new, it is vital to have a good appreciation of everything that already exists in this field. I myself have had many experiences confirming this to be so."

Some claimed that Kalashnikov copied designs like Bulkin's TKB-415 or Simonov's AVS-31.

Early designs
Kalashnikov started work on a submachine gun design in 1942 and light machine gun design in 1943. Early in 1944, Kalashnikov was given some 7.62×39mm M43 cartridges and informed that other designers were working on weapons for this new Soviet small-arms cartridge. It was suggested that a new weapon might well lead to greater things. He then undertook work on the new rifle. In 1944, he entered a design competition with this new 7.62×39mm, semi-automatic, gas-operated, long-stroke piston carbine, strongly influenced by the American M1 Garand. The new rifle was in the same class as the SKS-45 carbine, with a fixed magazine and gas tube above the barrel. However, the new Kalashnikov design lost out to a Simonov design.

In 1946, a new design competition was initiated to develop a new rifle. Kalashnikov submitted a gas-operated rifle with a short-stroke gas piston above the barrel, a breechblock mechanism similar to his 1944 carbine, and a curved 30-round magazine. Kalashnikov's rifles, the AK-1 (with a milled receiver) and AK-2 (with a stamped receiver), proved to be reliable weapons and were accepted to a second round of competition along with other designs.

These prototypes (also known as the AK-46) had a rotary bolt, a two-part receiver with separate trigger unit housing, dual controls (separate safety and fire selector switches) and a non-reciprocating charging handle located on the left side of the weapon. This design had many similarities to the StG 44. In late 1946, as the rifles were being tested, one of Kalashnikov's assistants, Aleksandr Zaitsev, suggested a major redesign to improve reliability. At first, Kalashnikov was reluctant, given that their rifle had already fared better than its competitors. Eventually, however, Zaitsev managed to persuade Kalashnikov.

In November 1947, the new prototypes (AK-47s) were completed. The rifle used a long-stroke gas piston above the barrel. The upper and lower receivers were combined into a single receiver. The selector and safety were combined into a single control lever/dust cover on the right side of the rifle. And, the bolt-handle was simply attached to the bolt-carrier. This simplified the design and production of the rifle. The first army trial series began in early 1948. The new rifle proved to be reliable under a wide range of conditions and possessed convenient handling characteristics. In 1949, it was adopted by the Soviet Army as "7.62 mm Kalashnikov rifle (AK)".

Further development

There were many difficulties during the initial phase of production. The first production models had stamped sheet metal receivers with a milled trunnion and butt stock insert, and a stamped body. Difficulties were encountered in welding the guide and ejector rails, causing high rejection rates. Instead of halting production, a heavy machined receiver was substituted for the sheet metal receiver. Even though production of these milled rifles started in 1951, they were officially referred to as AK-49, based on the date their development started, but they are widely known in the collectors' and current commercial market as "Type 2 AK-47". This was a more costly process, but the use of machined receivers accelerated production as tooling and labor for the earlier Mosin–Nagant rifle's machined receiver were easily adapted. Partly because of these problems, the Soviets were not able to distribute large numbers of the new rifle to soldiers until 1956. During this time, production of the interim SKS rifle continued.

Once the manufacturing difficulties of non-milled receivers had been overcome, a redesigned version designated the AKM (M for "modernized" or "upgraded"; in Russian:  []) was introduced in 1959. This new model used a stamped sheet metal receiver and featured a slanted muzzle brake on the end of the barrel to compensate for muzzle rise under recoil. In addition, a hammer retarder was added to prevent the weapon from firing out of battery (without the bolt being fully closed), during rapid or fully automatic fire. This is also sometimes referred to as a "cyclic rate reducer", or simply "rate reducer", as it also has the effect of reducing the number of rounds fired per minute during fully automatic fire. The rifle was also roughly one-third lighter than the previous model.

Most licensed and unlicensed productions of the Kalashnikov assault rifle abroad were of the AKM variant, partially due to the much easier production of the stamped receiver. This model is the most commonly encountered, having been produced in much greater quantities. All rifles based on the Kalashnikov design are often colloquially referred to as "AK-47s" in the West and some parts of Asia, although this is only correct when applied to rifles based on the original three receiver types. In most former Eastern Bloc countries, the weapon is known simply as the "Kalashnikov" or "AK". The differences between the milled and stamped receivers includes the use of rivets rather than welds on the stamped receiver, as well as the placement of a small dimple above the magazine well for stabilization of the magazine.

Replacement
In 1974, the Soviets began replacing their AK-47 and AKM rifles with a newer design, the AK-74, which uses 5.45×39mm ammunition. This new rifle and cartridge had only started to be manufactured in Eastern European nations when the Soviet Union collapsed, drastically slowing production of the AK-74 and other weapons of the former Soviet bloc.

Design 
The AK-47 was designed to be a simple, reliable fully automatic rifle that could be manufactured quickly and cheaply, using mass production methods that were state of the art in the Soviet Union during the late 1940s. The AK-47 uses a long-stroke gas system generally associated with high reliability in adverse conditions. The large gas piston, generous clearance between moving parts, and tapered cartridge case design allow the gun to endure large amounts of foreign matter and fouling without failing to cycle.

Cartridge 

The original Soviet M43 bullets are 123 grain boat-tail bullets with a copper-plated steel jacket, a large steel core, and some lead between the core and the jacket. The AK has excellent penetration when shooting through heavy foliage, walls or a common vehicle's metal body and into an opponent attempting to use these things as cover. The 7.62×39mm M43 projectile does not generally fragment when striking an opponent and has an unusual tendency to remain intact even after making contact with bone. The 7.62×39mm round produces significant wounding in cases where the bullet tumbles (yaws) in tissue, but produces relatively minor wounds in cases where the bullet exits before beginning to yaw. In the absence of yaw, the M43 round can pencil through tissue with relatively little injury.

Most, if not all, of the 7.62×39mm ammunition found today is of the upgraded M67 variety. This change also reduces penetration in ballistic gelatin to ~ for the newer M67 round versus ~ for the older M43 round. However, the wounding potential of M67 is mostly limited to the small permanent wound channel the bullet itself makes, especially when the bullet yaws.

Operating mechanism 

To fire, the operator inserts a loaded magazine, pulls back and releases the charging handle, and then pulls the trigger. In semi-automatic, the firearm fires only once, requiring the trigger to be released and depressed again for the next shot. In fully automatic, the rifle continues to fire automatically cycling fresh rounds into the chamber until the magazine is exhausted or pressure is released from the trigger. After ignition of the cartridge primer and propellant, rapidly expanding propellant gases are diverted into the gas cylinder above the barrel through a vent near the muzzle. The build-up of gases inside the gas cylinder drives the long-stroke piston and bolt carrier rearward and a cam guide machined into the underside of the bolt carrier, along with an ejector spur on the bolt carrier rail guide, rotates the bolt approximately 35° and unlocks it from the barrel extension via a camming pin on the bolt. The AK-47 does not have a gas valve; excess gases are ventilated through a series of radial ports in the gas cylinder. Unlike many other rifle platforms, such as the AR-15 platform, the Kalashnikov platform bolt locking lugs are chamfered allowing for primary extraction upon bolt rotation which aids reliable feeding and extraction, albeit not with that much force due to the short distance the bolt carrier travels before acting on the locking lug. The Kalashnikov platform then uses an extractor claw to eject the spent cartridge case.

Barrel 

The rifle received a barrel with a chrome-lined bore and four right-hand grooves at a 240 mm (1 in 9.45 in) or 31.5 calibers rifling twist rate. The gas block contains a gas channel that is installed at a slanted angle in relation to the bore axis. The muzzle is threaded for the installation of various muzzle devices such as a muzzle brake or a blank-firing adaptor.

Gas block
The gas block of the AK-47 features a cleaning rod capture or sling loop. Gas relief ports that alleviate gas pressure are placed horizontally in a row on the gas cylinder.

Fire selector 

The fire selector is a large lever located on the right side of the rifle; it acts as a dust cover and prevents the charging handle from being pulled fully to the rear when it is on safe. It is operated by the shooter's right fore-fingers and has three settings: safe (up), full-auto (center), and semi-auto (down). The reason for this is that a soldier under stress will push the selector lever down with considerable force, bypassing the full-auto stage and setting the rifle to semi-auto. To set the AK-47 to full-auto requires the deliberate action of centering the selector lever. To operate the fire selector lever, right-handed shooters have to briefly remove their right hand from the pistol grip, which is ergonomically sub-optimal. Some AK-type rifles also have a more traditional selector lever on the left side of the receiver, just above the pistol grip. This lever is operated by the shooter's right thumb and has three settings: safe (forward), full-auto (center), and semi-auto (backward).

Sights 

The front sight is a post adjustable for elevation in the field. Horizontal adjustment requires a special drift tool and is done by the armory before issue or if the need arises by an armorer after issue. The "point-blank range" battle zero setting "П" standing for постоянная (constant) on the 7.62×39mm AK-47 rear tangent sight element corresponds to a  zero. These settings mirror the Mosin–Nagant and SKS rifles, which the AK-47 replaced. For the AK-47 combined with service cartridges, the 300 m battle zero setting limits the apparent "bullet rise" within approximately  relative to the line of sight. Soldiers are instructed to fire at any target within this range by simply placing the sights on the center of mass (the belt buckle, according to Russian and former Soviet doctrine) of the enemy target. Any errors in range estimation are tactically irrelevant, as a well-aimed shot will hit the torso of the enemy soldier.

Furniture 
The AK-47 was originally equipped with a buttstock, handguard and an upper heat guard made from solid wood. With the introduction of the Type 3 receiver the buttstock, lower handguard and upper heatguard were manufactured from birch plywood laminates. Such engineered woods are stronger and resist warping better than the conventional one-piece patterns, do not require lengthy maturing, and are cheaper. The wooden furniture was finished with the Russian amber shellac finishing process. AKS and AKMS models featured a downward-folding metal butt-stock similar to that of the German MP40 submachine-gun, for use in the restricted space in the BMP infantry combat vehicle, as well as by paratroops. All 100 series AKs use plastic furniture with side-folding stocks.

Magazines 

The standard magazine capacity is 30 rounds. There are also 10, 20, and 40-round box magazines, as well as 75-round drum magazines.

The AK-47's standard 30-round magazines have a pronounced curve that allows them to smoothly feed ammunition into the chamber. Their heavy steel construction combined with "feed-lips" (the surfaces at the top of the magazine that control the angle at which the cartridge enters the chamber) machined from a single steel billet makes them highly resistant to damage. These magazines are so strong that "Soldiers have been known to use their mags as hammers, and even bottle openers". This contributes to the AK-47 magazine being more reliable, but makes it heavier than U.S. and NATO magazines.

The early slab-sided steel AK-47 30-round detachable box magazines had  sheet-metal bodies and weighed  empty. The later steel AKM 30-round magazines had lighter sheet-metal bodies with prominent reinforcing ribs weighing  empty. To further reduce weight, a lightweight magazine with an aluminum body with a prominent reinforcing waffle rib pattern weighing  empty was developed for the AKM that proved to be too fragile and the small issued amount of these magazines was quickly withdrawn from service. As a replacement steel-reinforced 30-round plastic 7.62×39mm box magazines were introduced. These rust-colored magazines weigh  empty and are often mistakenly identified as being made of Bakelite (a phenolic resin), but were actually fabricated from two-parts of AG-S4 molding compound (a glass-reinforced phenol-formaldehyde binder impregnated composite), assembled using an epoxy resin adhesive. Noted for their durability, these magazines did however compromise the rifle's camouflage and lacked the small horizontal reinforcing ribs running down both sides of the magazine body near the front that were added on all later plastic magazine generations. A second generation steel-reinforced dark-brown (color shades vary from maroon to plum to near black) 30-round 7.62×39mm magazine was introduced in the early 1980s, fabricated from ABS plastic. The third generation steel-reinforced 30-round 7.62×39mm magazine is similar to the second generation, but is darker colored and has a matte nonreflective surface finish. The current issue steel-reinforced matte true black nonreflective surface finished 7.62×39mm 30-round magazines, fabricated from ABS plastic weigh  empty.

The transition from steel to mainly plastic magazines yields a significant weight reduction and allows a soldier to carry more ammunition for the same weight.

All 7.62×39mm AK magazines are backwards compatible with older AK variants.

10.12 kg (22.3 lb) is the maximum amount of ammo that the average soldier can comfortably carry. It also allows for best comparison of the three most common 7.62×39mm AK magazines.

Most Yugoslavian and some East German AK magazines were made with cartridge followers that hold the bolt open when empty; however, most AK magazine followers allow the bolt to close when the magazine is empty.

Accessories 

The AK-47 bayonet is installed by slipping the  diameter muzzle ring around the muzzle and latching the handle down on the bayonet lug under the front sight base.

All current model AKM rifles can mount under-barrel 40 mm grenade launchers such as the GP-25 and its variants, which can fire up to 20 rounds per minute and have an effective range of up to 400 metres. The main grenade is the VOG-25 (VOG-25M) fragmentation grenade which has a 6 m (9 m) (20 ft (30 ft)) lethality radius.

The AK-47 can also mount a (rarely used) cup-type grenade launcher, the Kalashnikov grenade launcher that fires standard RGD-5 Soviet hand-grenades. The maximum effective range is approximately 150 meters. This launcher can also be used to launch tear-gas and riot control grenades.

All current AKs (100 series) and some older models, have side rails for mounting a variety of scopes and sighting devices, such as the PSO-1 Optical Sniper Sight. The side rails allow for the removal and remounting of optical accessories without interfering with the zeroing of the optic. However, the 100 series side folding stocks cannot be folded with the optics mounted.

Characteristics

Service life 
The AK-47 and its variants have been and are made in dozens of countries, with "quality ranging from finely engineered weapons to pieces of questionable workmanship." As a result, the AK-47 has a service/system life of approximately 6,000, to 10,000, to 15,000 rounds. The AK-47 was designed to be a cheap, simple, easy to manufacture rifle, perfectly matching Soviet military doctrine that treats equipment and weapons as disposable items. As units are often deployed without adequate logistical support and dependent on "battlefield cannibalization" for resupply, it is actually more cost-effective to replace rather than repair weapons.

The AK-47 has small parts and springs that need to be replaced every few thousand rounds. However, "Every time it is disassembled beyond the field stripping stage, it will take some time for some parts to regain their fit, some parts may tend to shake loose and fall out when firing the weapon. Some parts of the AK-47 line are riveted together. Repairing these can be quite a hassle, since the end of the rivet has to be ground off and a new one set after the part is replaced."

Variants 

 Early variants (7.62×39mm)
 Issue of 1948/49: Type 1: The very earliest models, stamped sheet metal receiver, are now very rare.
 Issue of 1951: Type 2: Has a milled receiver. Barrel and chamber are chrome plated to resist corrosion.
 Issue of 1954/55: Type 3: Lightened, milled receiver variant.
 AKS (AKS-47): Type 1, 2, or 3 receiver: Featured a downward-folding metal stock similar to that of the MP 40 produced in Nazi Germany, for use in the restricted space in the BMP infantry combat vehicle, as well as by paratroops.
 AKN (AKSN): Night scope rail.

 Modernized (7.62×39mm)
 AKM: A simplified, lighter version of the AK-47; Type 4 receiver is made from stamped and riveted sheet metal. A slanted muzzle device was added to counter climb in automatic fire. Rifle weight is  due to the lighter receiver. This is the most ubiquitous variant of the AK-47.
 AKMS: Under-folding stock version of the AKM intended for airborne troops.
 AKMN (AKMSN): Night scope rail.
 AKML (AKMSL): Slotted flash suppressor and night scope rail.
 RPK: Hand-held machine gun version with longer barrel and bipod. The variants—RPKS, RPKN (RPKSN), RPKL (RPKSL)—mirror AKM variants. The "S" variants have a side-folding wooden stock.

Foreign Variants (7.62×39mm)
Still in production primarily for export markets.

For the further developed AK models, see Kalashnikov rifles.

Production 

Manufacturing countries of AK-47 and its variants in alphabetical order.

A private company Kalashnikov Concern (formerly Izhmash) from Russia has repeatedly claimed that the majority of foreign manufacturers are producing AK-type rifles without proper licensing.

Accuracy potential

Western method
Later designs did not significantly improve the rifle's accuracy.

The best shooters are able to hit a man-sized target at  within five shots (firing from prone or bench rest position) or ten shots (standing).

The single-shot hit-probability on the NATO E-type Silhouette Target (a human upper body half and head silhouette) of the AK-47 and the later developed AK-74, M16A1 and M16A2 rifles were measured by the US military under ideal proving ground conditions in the 1980s as follows:

Under worst field exercise circumstances, the hit probabilities for all the tested rifles were drastically reduced, 34% at 50m down to 3–4% at 600m with no significant differences between weapons at each range.

Russian method
The following table represents the Russian method for determining accuracy, which is far more complex than Western methods. In the West, one fires a group of shots into the target and then simply measures the overall diameter of the group. The Russians, on the other hand, fire a group of shots into the target. They then draw two circles on the target, one for the maximum vertical dispersion of hits and one for the maximum horizontal dispersion of hits. They then disregard the hits on the outer part of the target and only count half of the hits (50% or R50) on the inner part of the circles. This dramatically reduces the overall diameter of the groups. They then use both the vertical and horizontal measurements of the reduced groups to measure accuracy. This circular error probable method used by the Russians and other European militaries cannot be converted and is not comparable to US military methods for determining rifle accuracy. When the R50 results are doubled the hit probability increases to 93.7%.

 R50 means the closest 50 percent of the shot group will all be within a circle of the mentioned diameter.

Users 

 
 
 
 
 
 
 
 
 
 
 
 
 
 
 
 
 
 
 
 : Type 56 variant.
 
 
 
 
 
 
 
 
 
  
 
 
 : EKAM: The counter-terrorist unit of the Hellenic Police.
 
 
 
 
 
 
 
 
 
 
 
 
 
 
 
 
 
 
 
 
 
 
 
 
 : Type 58 variant.
 
  – Locally made as well as being in service with the Army
 
 
 
 
 : Replaced by the AKM in 1959 and the AK-74 in 1974.
 
 
 
 
 
 
 
 
 
 
 
  Used by Thahan Phran

Former users 
 : MPi-K (AK-47) and MPi-KM (AKM).
 
 : Replaced by the AKM and AK-74.
: Captured from PAVN and Vietcong

Illicit trade 

Throughout the world, the AK and its variants are commonly used by governments, revolutionaries, terrorists, criminals, and civilians alike. In some countries, such as Somalia, Rwanda, Mozambique, Congo and Tanzania, the prices for Black Market AKs are between $30 and $125 per weapon and prices have fallen in the last few decades due to mass counterfeiting. In Kenya, "an AK-47 fetches five head of cattle (about 10,000 Kenya shillings or 100 U.S. dollars) when offered for barter, but costs almost half that price when cash is paid". There are places around the world where AK type weapons can be purchased on the black market "for as little as $6, or traded for a chicken or a sack of grain".

The AK-47 has also spawned a cottage industry of sorts and has been copied and manufactured (one gun at a time) in small shops around the world (see Khyber Pass Copy). The estimated numbers of AK-type weapons vary greatly. The Small Arms Survey suggest that "between 70 and 100 million of these weapons have been produced since 1947". The World Bank estimates that out of the 500 million total firearms available worldwide, 100 million are of the Kalashnikov family, and 75 million are AK-47s. Because AK-type weapons have been made in many countries, often illicitly, it is impossible to know how many really exist.

Conflicts 

The AK-47 has been used in the following conflicts:

1950s
 Hungarian Revolution (1956)
 Vietnam War (1955–1975)
 Laotian Civil War (1959–1975)

1960s
 Congo Crisis (1960–1965)
 Portuguese Colonial War (1961–1974)
 Rhodesian Bush War (1964–1979)
 The Troubles (late 1960s–1998)
 Communist insurgency in Thailand (1965–1983)
 South African Border War (1966–1990)
 India-China clashes (1967)
 Cambodian Civil War (1968–1975)
 Communist insurgency in Malaysia (1968–1989)

1970s
 Yom Kippur War (1973)
 Ethiopian Civil War (1974–1991)
 Western Sahara War (1975–1991)
 Cambodian–Vietnamese War (1978–1989)
 Chadian–Libyan conflict (1978–1987)
 Soviet–Afghan War (1979–1989)

1980s
 Iran–Iraq War (1980–1988)
 Kashmir Insurgency (1988–2022)
 Sri Lankan Civil War (1983–2009)
 United States invasion of Grenada (1983)
 Lord's Resistance Army insurgency (1987–present)

1990s
 Tuareg rebellion (1990–1995)
 Gulf War (1990–1991)
 Somali Civil War (1991–present)
 Yugoslav Wars (1991–2001)
 Burundian Civil War (1993–2005)
 Congo Civil War (1997–1999)
 Kargil War (1999)

2000s
 War in Afghanistan (2001–2021)
 Iraq War (2003–2011)
 South Thailand insurgency (2004–present)
Mexican Drug War (2006–present)

2010s
 Libyan Civil War (2011)
 Syrian Civil War (2011–present)
 Iraqi insurgency (2011–2013)
 Central African Republic Civil War (2012–present)
 Russo-Ukrainian war (2014–present)

2020s
 2020 Nagorno-Karabakh war (2020)
 Tigray War (2020–2022)
 Russian invasion of Ukraine (2022–present)

Cultural influence and impact 

During the Cold War, the Soviet Union and the People's Republic of China, as well as United States and other NATO nations supplied arms and technical knowledge to numerous countries and rebel forces around the world. During this time the Western countries used relatively expensive automatic rifles, such as the FN FAL, the HK G3, the M14, and the M16. In contrast, the Russians and Chinese used the AK-47; its low production cost and ease of manufacture allow them to make AKs in vast numbers.

In the pro-communist states, the AK-47 became a symbol of the Third World revolution. They were utilized in the Cambodian Civil War and the Cambodian–Vietnamese War. During the 1980s, the Soviet Union became the principal arms dealer to countries embargoed by Western nations, including Middle Eastern nations such as Libya and Syria, which welcomed Soviet Union backing against Israel. After the fall of the Soviet Union, AK-47s were sold both openly and on the black market to any group with cash, including drug cartels and dictatorial states, and more recently they have been seen in the hands of Islamic groups such as Al-Qaeda, ISIL, and the Taliban in Afghanistan and Iraq, and FARC, Ejército de Liberación Nacional guerrillas in Colombia.

In Russia, the Kalashnikov is a tremendous source of national pride. "The family of the inventor of the world's most famous rifle, Mikhail Kalashnikov, has authorized German engineering company MMI to use the well-known Kalashnikov name on a variety of not-so-deadly goods." In recent years, Kalashnikov Vodka has been marketed with souvenir bottles in the shape of the AK-47 Kalashnikov. There are also Kalashnikov watches, umbrellas, and knives.

The Kalashnikov Museum (also called the AK-47 museum) opened on 4 November 2004 in Izhevsk, Udmurt Republic. This city is in the Ural Region of Russia. The museum chronicles the biography of General Kalashnikov and documents the invention of the AK-47. The museum complex of Kalashnikov's small arms, a series of halls, and multimedia exhibitions are devoted to the evolution of the AK-47 rifle and attracts 10,000 monthly visitors. Nadezhda Vechtomova, the museum director, stated in an interview that the purpose of the museum is to honor the ingenuity of the inventor and the hard work of the employees and to "separate the weapon as a weapon of murder from the people who are producing it and to tell its history in our country".

On 19 September 2017 a  monument of Kalashnikov was unveiled in central Moscow. A protester, later detained by police, attempted to unfurl a banner reading "a creator of weapons is a creator of death".

The proliferation of this weapon is reflected by more than just numbers. The AK-47 is included on the flag of Mozambique and its emblem, an acknowledgment that the country gained its independence in large part through the effective use of their AK-47s. It is also found in the coats of arms of East Timor, Zimbabwe and the revolution era Burkina Faso, as well as in the flags of Hezbollah, Syrian Resistance, FARC-EP, the New People's Army, TKP/TIKKO and the International Revolutionary People's Guerrilla Forces.

U.S. and Western Europe countries frequently associate the AK-47 with their enemies; both Cold War era and present-day. For example, Western works of fiction (movies, television, novels, video games) often portray criminals, gang members, insurgents, and terrorists using AK-47s as the weapon of choice. Conversely, throughout the developing world, the AK-47 can be positively attributed with revolutionaries against foreign occupation, imperialism, or colonialism.

In Ireland the AK-47 is associated with The Troubles due to its extensive use by republican paramilitaries during this period. In 2013, a decommissioned AK-47 was included in the A History of Ireland in 100 Objects collection.

The AK-47 made an appearance in U.S. popular culture as a recurring focus in the Nicolas Cage film Lord of War (2005). Numerous monologues in the movie focus on the weapon, and its effects on global conflict and the gun running market.

In Iraq and Afghanistan, private military company contractors from the U.K. and other countries used the AK-47 and its variants along with Western firearms such as the AR-15.

In 2006, the Colombian musician and peace activist César López devised the escopetarra, an AK converted into a guitar. One sold for US$17,000 in a fundraiser held to benefit the victims of anti-personnel mines, while another was exhibited at the United Nations' Conference on Disarmament.

In Mexico, the AK-47 is known as "Cuerno de Chivo" (literally "Goat's Horn") because of its curved magazine design. It is one of the weapons of choice of Mexican drug cartels. It is sometimes mentioned in Mexican folk music lyrics.

Gallery

See also 
 Comparison of the AK-47 and M16
 AK-12
 PK machine gun

Notes

References

Bibliography

Further reading 

Ружье. Оружие и амуниция, 1999/3, pp. 18–21 has an article about the AK-47 prototypes.
 An article rejecting some of the alternative theories as to the authorship of the AK-47.
 An article comparing the internals of the StG 44 and AK-47.
 Transcription of the commission report on the testing round from the summer of 1947; no winner was selected at this point, but the commission held Kalashnikov's, Dementiev's and Bulkin's designs as most closely satisfying TTT number 3131.
 Report/letter on the final round of testing, 27 December 1947, declaring Kalashnikov's design the winner.
 Articles on the 1948 military trials.

External links

US Army Operator's Manual for the AK-47 Assault Rifle

 & 

Weapons and ammunition introduced in 1947
7.62×39mm assault rifles
Infantry weapons of the Cold War
Rifles of the Cold War
Kalashnikov derivatives
Assault rifles of the Soviet Union
Kalashnikov Concern products